Bradley Don Adkins is an American track and field athlete who competes in the high jump. At the 2016 Olympic Trials, he finished third in the men's high jump and qualified for the 2016 Summer Olympics in Rio de Janeiro.

Adkins was the 2014 Outdoor High Jump Champion in the NCAA Big 12 Conference.

Adkins is married to fellow Texas Tech athlete, Maggie Adkins.

References

Living people
American male high jumpers
Olympic track and field athletes of the United States
Texas Tech Red Raiders men's track and field athletes
Athletes (track and field) at the 2016 Summer Olympics
1993 births
21st-century American people